Jacques Labouchere (born July 4, 1978) is an American singer-songwriter and guitarist living in Göteborg, Sweden.

Biography
Jacques is a singer-songwriter and pioneer of the New Weird Sweden folk movement, who was born near the trails of the Appalachian mountains in Sharon, Connecticut, US. He grew up all over the East Coast before moving to London in his teens only to return again to the US before heading back to the EU and settling in Gothenburg (Göteborg),Sweden where he now resides and is a citizen. He quickly started a band called Ghost Dance Disturbance that in their brief time together recorded 1 ep, "Welcome in the Cabin Fever", before disbanding after many local gigs in late summer 2006. He also sang backing vocals for We do not negotiate with terrorists as a guest musician on their first CD, and later joined the band to play bass for a brief period. After some time off he decided to make a comeback solo and has as of present released three full-length albums. Self-titled, "Jacques Labouchere" in 2007, recorded and produced by Martin Molin of Detektivbyrån, "Bi-polar Baby Strollers" in 2010, recorded at Music-a-matic Studios. And the latest album "Piece", was released on October 27, 2017.

His self-titled début was independently released in March 2007. He then released his 2nd album Bi-polar Baby Strollers and accompanying music video of the single "2nd Long Street" on June, 21st 2010.

On June 2, 2017 he released the first single; "It´s not what you think"; from his third album . The second single was released September 1 and is called "Do what you want".

Jacques shared the bill with Alan Mcgee, José González and his band Junip, at The Gothenburg International Film Festival (Europe's largest) in February 2011 and has started slowly to record his 3rd upcoming album with plans to release in 2012. He has a catalogue of many new songs that are redefining his sound and live performance constantly as he continues to tour wherever possible.

In addition to extensive gigging in Scandinavia, and regular performances in Göteborg, Sweden and London, UK, a full-length tour of the UK in June 2011 followed a performance on the Antje Oeklesund stage at Fête de la Musique in Berlin before returning to Sweden to play at Sweden's largest music festival, Peace and Love Festival, on July 1, 2011 supporting head-liner Bob Dylan, Jacques returned home from a month of shows and residencies in New York City and Brooklyn in late January thru February 2012.

After the release of his latest album Jacques has gone on tour; (28/10-17 to 3/12-17); paired with "This Frontier Neds Heroes" at most of the venues. They will be playing in Spain, Italy, Germany and one venue in The Netherlands.

Albums 
 Jacques Labouchere (2007)
 Bi-polar Baby Strollers (2010)
 Piece (2017)
 ''Connecting Flights (2021)

References

https://www.fredperry.com/subculture/article-jacques-labouchere

https://www.nordicmusicreview.com/single-post/2017/10/27/Jacques-Labouchere---Piece

American singer-songwriters
American male singer-songwriters
1978 births
Living people
21st-century American singers
21st-century American male singers